The Brothers in Arms Tour was a concert tour by British rock band Dire Straits. The tour promoted and supported the group's fifth album, Brothers in Arms, which was released in May 1985.

The tour started on 25 April 1985 in Split, Croatia and ended on 26 April 1986 in Sydney, Australia. It included dates in the Balkans, Israel, Europe, North America, and Oceania. The tour included 248 concerts in 23 countries and 118 cities. More than two and a half million people attended the tour. With 900,000 tickets sold in Australia and New Zealand it was the biggest concert tour in Australasian music history, until it was overtaken in 2017–2018 by Ed Sheeran on his ÷ Tour.

Description
The tour lineup included Mark Knopfler (guitar and vocals), John Illsley (bass), Alan Clark & Guy Fletcher (keyboards), Terry Williams (drums), Jack Sonni (guitar), and Chris White (saxophone).

During the tour, Dire Straits performed "Money for Nothing" with Sting and "Sultans of Swing" at the Live Aid concert at Wembley Stadium on 13 July 1985. Their performance was included on the DVD release of that event. The final concert on 26 April 1986 in Sydney, Australia was broadcast on television. TubeTV also filmed the show in London on 10 July 1985. Neither the Sydney nor the London shows were ever released as commercial videos and are available as bootlegs only. In addition, three soundboard recordings were made in San Antonio, Houston, and Ohio, which have also circulated as bootlegs.

The Brothers in Arms Tour consisted of four legs:
 Europe and Israel
 North America
 Europe
 Australia and New Zealand

Tour dates

Setlists
 25 April 1985 (Split) - "Ride Across the River", "Expresso Love", "So Far Away", "Romeo and Juliet", "Private Investigations", "Sultans of Swing", "Walk of Life", "Why Worry", "Six Blade Knife", "The Man's Too Strong", "Two Young Lovers", "Money for Nothing", "Portobello Belle", "Wild West End", "Tunnel of Love", "Brothers in Arms", "Solid Rock"
 13 May 1985 (Ljubljana) - "Ride Across the River", "Expresso Love", "So Far Away", "Romeo and Juliet", "Private Investigations", "Sultans of Swing", "Why Worry", "Walk of Life", "Two Young Lovers", "The Man's Too Strong", "Money for Nothing", "Wild West End", "Tunnel of Love", "Solid Rock", "Going Home: Theme from Local Hero"
 16 May 1985 (Brno) - "Ride Across the River", "Expresso Love", "So Far Away", "Romeo and Juliet", "Private Investigations", "Sultans of Swing", "Why Worry", "Walk of Life", "Two Young Lovers", "The Man's Too Strong", "Money for Nothing", "Wild West End", "Tunnel of Love", "Brothers in Arms", "Solid Rock", "Going Home: Theme from Local Hero"
 North American Leg - "Ride Across the River", "Expresso Love", "One World", "Romeo and Juliet", "Private Investigations", "Sultans of Swing", "Why Worry", "Walk of Life", "Two Young Lovers", "Money for Nothing", "Wild West End", "Tunnel of Love", "Brothers in Arms", "Solid Rock", "Going Home: Theme from Local Hero"
 26 April 1986 (Sydney) - "Ride Across the River", "Expresso Love", "Industrial Disease", "So Far Away", "Romeo and Juliet", "Private Investigations", "Sultans of Swing", "Why Worry", "Your Latest Trick", "Walk of Life", "Two Young Lovers", "Money for Nothing", "Tunnel of Love", "Brothers in Arms", "Solid Rock", "Going Home: Theme from Local Hero"

References

1985 concert tours
1986 concert tours
Dire Straits concert tours